was a Japanese actor. His wife was actress Yatsuko Tanami. He appeared in more than 200 films between 1950 and 1993.

Career

Kaneko was a versatile character actor, playing roles ranging from comedic buffoons to hardened yakuza bosses. He is especially known for his role as Yoshio Yamamori in the Battles Without Honor and Humanity series.

Kaneko started his acting career at the Bungakuza theater troupe in 1946. His film debut was in the 1946 film Urashimano Kōei. In 1952, he appeared in the Akira Kurosawa film Ikiru. He signed his contract with Nikkatsu film company in 1955 and he often played villains in action films.

He was the host of a cooking program Kaneko Nobuo no Tanoshi Yushoku from 1987 to 1995 on TV Asahi.

Selected filmography

Film

 Urashimano Kōei (1946)
 Ikiru (1952) - Mitsuo Watanabe
 The Garden of Women (1954) - Kihei Hirato
 Sound of the Mountain (1954)
 Floating Clouds (1955)
 A Hole of My Own Making (1955)
 Ruri no kishi (1956)
 Gesshoku (1956)
 Sun in the Last Days of the Shogunate (1957) - Sagamiya
 Man Who Causes a Storm (1957)
 This Day's Life (1957)
 Night Drum (1958)
 Voice Without a Shadow (1958)
 The Wandering Guitarist (1959)
  Intimidation (1960)
  Youth of the Beast (1963)
 Detective Bureau 23: Go to Hell, Bastards! (1963)
 Red Handkerchief (1964) - Detective Tsuchiya
 Fight, Zatoichi, Fight (1964) - Unosuke
 Kiri no Hata (1965) - Tanimura
 The Magic Serpent (1966)
 Tokyo Drifter 2: The Sea is Bright Red as the Color of Love (1966) - Segawa
 Portrait of Chieko (1967) - Yamazaki
 Goke, Body Snatcher from Hell (1968) - Tokuyasu
 Curse of the Blood (1968) - Dr.Yasukawa Sōjun
 The Valiant Red Peony (1968)
 The Living Skeleton (1968) - Sueji
 Daikanbu Nagurikomi (1969)
  Terrifying Girls' High School: Lynch Law Classroom (1973)
 Battles Without Honor and Humanity (1973) - Yoshio Yamamori
 Battles Without Honor and Humanity: Deadly Fight in Hiroshima (1973) - Yoshio Yamamori
 Battles Without Honor and Humanity: Proxy War (1973) - Yoshio Yamamori
 Battles Without Honor and Humanity: Police Tactics (1974) - Yoshio Yamamori
 Battles Without Honor and Humanity: Final Episode (1974) - Yoshio Yamamori
 New Battles Without Honor and Humanity (1974) - Yoshio Yamamori
 Cops vs. Thugs (1975) - Tomoyasu
 Yakuza Graveyard (1976) - Akama
 Shin Joshū Sasori: 701-gō (1976) - Osamu Sasaki
 Shogun's Samurai (1978) - Kujō Michifusa
 The Fall of Ako Castle (1978) - Kira Yoshinaka
 Never Give up (1978)
 Aftermath of Battles Without Honor and Humanity (1979) - Hirokichi Asakura
 Sanada Yukimura no Bōryaku (1979) - Hayashi Razan
 Hattori Hanzō Kageno Gundan (1980) - Tokugawa Mitsukuni
 Shōgun (1980) - Sekido Kazunari
 Imperial Navy (1981), Chūichi Nagumo
 The Return of Godzilla (1984) - Minister of Home Affairs Isomura
 226 (1989) - Yoshiyuki Kawashima
 Ōte (1991)
 Edo Jō Tairan (1991), Tokugawa Mitsutomo
 Kokkaie Ikō (1993) - Tokuro Morishita

Television
 Shinsho Taikōki (1973) - Ankokuji Ekei
 Shiroi Kyotō (1978–1979) - Jūkichi Iwata
 Kusa Moeru (1979) - Taira no Kiyomori
 Fumō Chitai (1979) - Kaizuka
 Hattori Hanzō: Kage no Gundan (1980) - Sakai Tadakiyo
 Dokuganryū Masamune (1987) - Date Harumune
 Tobuga Gotoku (1990) - Tokugawa Nariaki

References

External links

1923 births
1995 deaths
Japanese male film actors
20th-century Japanese male actors
People from Tokyo
Male actors from Tokyo
People from Taitō